José Ángel López López (born 25 August 1999) is a Mexican professional footballer who plays as a forward.

Career statistics

Club

References

External links
 
 
 

Living people
1999 births
Mexican footballers
Ascenso MX players
Association football forwards
Club América footballers
FC Juárez footballers
Footballers from Veracruz
Liga MX players
Liga de Expansión MX players
Tlaxcala F.C. players
People from Coatzacoalcos